Jorge Ortí Gracia (born 28 April 1993) is a Spanish former professional footballer who played as a forward.

Club career
A product of hometown club Real Zaragoza's youth ranks, Ortí was born in Zaragoza, Aragon, and made his first-team – and La Liga – debut on 26 October 2011 against Valencia CF, coming on as a substitute for Hélder Postiga in the 76th minute of a 0–1 home defeat. He spent several seasons as a senior mainly registered with the reserves, however.

On 24 January 2014, Ortí joined Villarreal CF B in Segunda División B on loan until the end of the campaign. On 7 July 2016 he signed for Cultural y Deportiva Leonesa of the same league, also in a temporary deal.

After achieving promotion from the third tier as champions, Ortí terminated his contract with Zaragoza on 20 July 2017. He continued playing in the lower leagues, with CD Toledo and CD Teruel.

On 16 July 2019, Hong Kong Premier League side Hong Kong Pegasus FC announced the signing of Ortí.

Honours
Cultural Leonesa
Segunda División B: 2016–17

References

External links

1993 births
Living people
Footballers from Zaragoza
Spanish footballers
Association football forwards
La Liga players
Segunda División players
Segunda División B players
Tercera División players
Real Zaragoza B players
Real Zaragoza players
Villarreal CF B players
Cultural Leonesa footballers
CD Toledo players
CD Teruel footballers
Hong Kong Premier League players
TSW Pegasus FC players
Spain youth international footballers
Spanish expatriate footballers
Expatriate footballers in Hong Kong
Spanish expatriate sportspeople in Hong Kong